Klaus Brandner (born 13 January 1949 in Kalletal) is a German politician and member of the SPD.

External links
 Official website 

1949 births
Living people
People from Lippe
Members of the Bundestag for North Rhine-Westphalia
Members of the Bundestag 2009–2013
Members of the Bundestag 2005–2009
Members of the Bundestag 2002–2005
Members of the Bundestag 1998–2002
Members of the Bundestag for the Social Democratic Party of Germany